Generation gap is a term for differences between people of a younger generation and their elders. 

Generation gap may also refer to: 
 Generation gap (pattern), a pattern for modifying or extending generated software code
 The Generation Gap, a 1969 American game show that aired on ABC
 Generation Gap (game show), a 2022 American game show that airs on ABC
 Generation Gap, a 2004 American children's special that aired on PBS
 "The Generation Gap" (song), a 1988 single by Hoodoo Gurus